Dichostates kuntzeni is a species of beetle in the family Cerambycidae. It was described by Hintz in 1912. It is known from Cameroon, Equatorial Guinea, Gabon, the Democratic Republic of the Congo, Uganda, and Sierra Leone. It contains the varietas Dichostates kuntzeni var. ochreicollis.

References

Crossotini
Beetles described in 1912